The women's K-2 500 metres canoe sprint competition at the 2015 European Games in Baku took place between 14 and 16 June at the Kur Sport and Rowing Centre in Mingachevir.

Schedule
The schedule was as follows:

All times are Azerbaijan Summer Time (UTC+5)

Results

Heats
The fastest three boats in each heat advanced directly to the final. The next four fastest boats in each heat, plus the fastest remaining boat advanced to the semifinal.

Heat 1

Heat 2

Semifinal
The fastest three boats advanced to the final.

Final
Competitors in this final raced for positions 1 to 9, with medals going to the top three.

References

Women's K-2 500 metres
European Games